María Lucelly Murillo (born 5 May 1991) is a Colombian athlete specialising in the javelin throw. She represented her country at the 2011 World Championships without advancing for the final. She competed in the 2020 Summer Olympics.

Her personal best in the event is 61.46 metres set in Medellín in 2019.

International competitions

References

1991 births
Living people
Colombian female javelin throwers
Competitors at the 2010 Central American and Caribbean Games
Competitors at the 2014 Central American and Caribbean Games
Competitors at the 2018 Central American and Caribbean Games
Central American and Caribbean Games gold medalists for Colombia
Central American and Caribbean Games bronze medalists for Colombia
Pan American Games competitors for Colombia
Athletes (track and field) at the 2019 Pan American Games
Central American and Caribbean Games medalists in athletics
Ibero-American Championships in Athletics winners
Athletes (track and field) at the 2020 Summer Olympics
Olympic athletes of Colombia
20th-century Colombian women
21st-century Colombian women